is a Japanese comedian, singer and television presenter. He is represented with Asai Kikaku. His daughter is tarento Mari Sekine.

Sekine is partnered with Kazuki Kosakai, who is a junior at his talent agency and also a longtime best friend, in a comedy duo called Kosakin.

Filmography

TV programmes
 Current appearances

 Specials

Internet TV

 Former appearances
 Regular appearances and one-off specials only
 NHK · NHK-BS

 Nippon TV

 Tokyo Broadcasting System

 Fuji Television · BS Fuji
{|class="wikitable"
|-
! Year
! Title
! Notes
! Ref.
|-
| 1984 || Kokoro wa Lonely Kimochi wa "..." || ||
|-
|rowspan="2"| 1985 || Waratte Iitomo! || Regular ||
|-
|Ore-tachi Hyōkin-zoku || Semi-regular (late programme) ||
|-
|rowspan="2"| 1989 || Kuni-chan no Yamada katsute nai TV || ||
|-
|Quiz! Hayaku itte yo || ||
|-
| || Tamori-Takeshi-Sanma Big 3 Seiki no Golf Match || Narrator (except the 3rd and 6th) ||
|-
| 1992 || Sekine & Lou no! Quiz Success || ||
|-
|rowspan="3"| 1994 || Quiz! Toshi no Sa nante || Adult Team solver ||
|-
|TV Cruise: Tonari no Papaya || Thursday caster ||
|-
|Yo! Taishō mi kke || ||
|-
| 1995 || Entame Yūenchi: Tokyo Ijū Keikaku || ||
|-
| 1997 || Unbelievable || ||
|-
| 1999 || Akashiya Mansion Monogatari || "Kramer Kramer" as Tsutomu-kun ||
|-
| 2000 || 100% Kyaeen! || ||
|-
|rowspan="3"| 2001 || Fight Money || ||
|-
|Akashiya Ukenen Monogatari || ||
|-
|Sugo Ude! Bout || ||
|-
|rowspan="2"| 2002 || The Letters: Kazoku no Ai ni arigatō || ||
|-
|Moshimo Tours || ||
|-
| 2004 || Lion no gokigenyō || Kazuki Kosakai's substitute due to resting in illness ||
|-
|rowspan="2"| 2005 || Tamori no Japonica Logos || ||
|-
|100 Hitome no Baka || ||
|-
| 2006 || Hitoshi Matsumoto no suberanai Hanashi || Episodes 8 and 10 ||
|-
|rowspan="3"| 2008 || Tsutomu Sekine 5 Minutes Performance || ||
|-
|Ikkakusenkin! Nihon Rou Rettō || Quasi-regular ||
|-
|Be Ponkikki || "Tobe BB!" Si-Sensei ||
|-
| 2009 || Honne no Dendō!! Shinsuke ni hawa karumai || Regular ||
|-
| 2014 || Kosakin Dōchū: Bura bbura bbura'! || ||
|-
| 2015 || Shōjiki sanpo || Mari's substitute due to maternity leave ||
|}

 TV Asahi

 TV Tokyo

 Japanese Association of Independent Television Stations

 Broadcasting and communications satellite

Radio
 Current appearances

 Former appearances

TV dramas
{|class="wikitable"
|-
! Year
! Title
! Role
! Network
! Notes
|-
|rowspan="2"| 1976 || Tanuki Sensei Sōdō-ki || || Fuji TV ||
|-
|Himitsu Sentai Gorenger || Truck driver || TV Asahi || Episode 57
|-
| 1977 || Zenryaku Ofukuro-sama || || NTV || Series 2 Episode 14
|-
| 1978 || Ponkotsu Robot Taihei-ki || || NHK ||
|-
| 1979 || Akuryō no Sumu Yakata || || KTV ||
|-
|rowspan="2"| 1980 || Shin Edo no Senpū || Umekichi ||rowspan="2"| Fuji TV || Episode 16
|-
|Tadaima Hōkago || Komaki Oga ||
|-
|rowspan="3"| 1981 || Tamanegi muitara... || Tadahiro Kawakami ||rowspan="2"| TBS || Episodes 9, 13, 27
|-
|Keiji Inu Curl 2 || Osawa ||
|-
|Adauchi Senshu || || Fuji TV ||
|-
| 1982 || Onihei Hanka-chō || || TV Asahi || Series 3 Episode 4
|-
|rowspan="3"| 1987 || Ore no Musuko wa Genkijirushi || || NTV ||
|-
|Human Crossing || || TBS ||
|-
|Akireta Keiji' || Ken Ishida || NTV ||
|-
| 1988 || Tsūkai! Rock'n Roll-dōri || Ryuji Kurosawa ||rowspan="3"| TBS ||
|-
| 1989 || Imasara, Hatsukoi || Ryo Tasaki ||
|-
|rowspan="2"| 1990 || Joshidai-sei Kiken na Arubaito: Sumikomi Kateikyōshi-hen || ||
|-
|Yonimo Kimyōna Monogatari: Shitai kusai || Naoto Hishi ||rowspan="2"| Fuji TV ||
|-
|rowspan="2"| 1992 || Yonimo Kimyōna Monogatari: Oyaji || ||
|-
|Tokugawa Buraichō || Yagyū Jūbei Mitsuyoshi || TV Tokyo || Episode 16
|-
| 2003 || Kokoro wa Lonely Kimochi wa "...." XI || ||rowspan="2"| NTV ||
|-
|rowspan="3"| 2014 || Senryoku-gai Sōsa-kan || Shinjuro Kaneshiro ||
|-
|Ressha Sentai ToQger ||rowspan="2"| Conductor ||rowspan="2"| TV Asahi ||
|-
|Ressha Sentai ToQger vs. Kamen Rider Gaim: Spring Break Combined Special ||
|-
|2019 || Natsuzora || || NHK ||Asadora
|-
|}

Films

Direct-to-video · narration
 Direct-to-video

 Narration

Stage/events

Advertisements
 Current

 Former

Discography/Bibliography
CD

VHS · DVD

Books

Films

Impression repertoire
Sonny Chiba
Hideji Ōtaki
Koichi Wajima
Isao Aoki
Giant Baba
Shigeo Nagashima

Related works
Ichiro YamanakaTsutomu Sekine noTensaina noda. (March 1997, Fūjin-sha) Tsutomu Sekine-Lou Oshiba 100-Sai no Chōsen (December 2004, Īzuka Shoten) 2003 Īno Kenji Taidan-shū'' (1999, Sony Magazines)

References

External links
 

Tsutomu Sekine at all cinema 
Tsutomu Sekine at Kinenote 

Tsutomu Sekine - Movie Walker 
2002 Yellow Ribbon Award: Tsutomu Sekine (Japan Father's Day Committee) 
Tsutomu Sekine Interview (Institute for Labor Administration, Foundation) 

Japanese impressionists (entertainers)
Japanese television personalities
Japanese television presenters
Japanese film directors
Japanese radio personalities
Japanese male television actors
Japanese male film actors
Nihon University alumni
Comedians from Tokyo
1953 births
Living people